Gol-e Zard-e Qaleh (also Romanized as Gol-e Zard-e Qal‘eh; also known as Gol-e Zard, Gol Zard, and Gul-i-Zard) is a village in Nahr-e Mian Rural District, Zalian District, Shazand County, Markazi Province, Iran. At the 2006 census, its population was 818, in 222 families.

References 

Populated places in Shazand County